Cristiana Girelli (born 23 April 1990) is an Italian professional footballer who plays as a striker for Serie A club Juventus FC and the Italy women's national team.

Girelli joined Juventus in 2018, after five seasons with ACF Brescia Femminile. She was the second top scorer of the 2014–15 season with 27 goals, the top scorer of the 2019–20 season with 16 goals, and the top scorer of the 2020–21 season.

International career
She made her debut for the senior Italian national team in a March 2013 friendly against England, and soon afterwards she was selected for the 2013 UEFA Euro's final tournament. She led the Italian scoring in the qualifiers for the 2017 UEFA Euro, where she scored a late winner against Olympic runner-up Sweden. She has also been an Under-19 international.

Honours 
Bardolino
 Serie A: 2007, 2008, 2009
 Italian Women's Cup: 2006, 2007, 2009
 Italian Women's Super Cup: 2005, 2007, 2008

Brescia
 Serie A: 2015–16
 Italian Women's Cup: 2015, 2016
 Italian Women's Super Cup: 2014, 2015, 2016; runners-up 2017

Juventus
 Serie A: 2018–19, 2019–20, 2020–21, 2021–22
 Coppa Italia: 2018–19, 
 Supercoppa Italiana: 2019, 2020–21, 2021–22

Individual
 Serie A Female Footballer of the Year: 2020

See also 
 List of FIFA Women's World Cup hat-tricks

References

External links 

 

1990 births
Living people
Italian women's footballers
A.S.D. AGSM Verona F.C. players
A.C.F. Brescia Calcio Femminile players
Serie A (women's football) players
Footballers from Brescia
Women's association football forwards
Juventus F.C. (women) players
2019 FIFA Women's World Cup players
Italy women's international footballers
UEFA Women's Euro 2022 players
UEFA Women's Euro 2017 players